The Russian Latin alphabet is the common name for various variants of writing the Russian language by means of the Alphabet.

History

Latin in East Slavic languages 
The first cases of using Latin to write East Slavic languages were found in the documents of the Grand Duchy of Lithuania and the Commonwealth in the 16th–18th centuries. These recordings were typically made in Ruthenian, written essentially following the rules of Polish orthography. In the 17th century in the Moscow region it became fashionable to make short notes in Russian in the letters of the Latin alphabet. This practice was especially widespread in the 1680s and 1690s.

Known records of the Russian language by foreign travelers include a French dictionary-phrasebook of the 16th century in the Latin alphabet and a dictionary-diary of Richard James, mostly in Latin graphics (influenced by the orthography of various Western European languages), but interspersed with letters of the Greek and Russian alphabets.

In the 19th century and the first half of the 20th, Polish Latin was used to convey the Belarusian language. The Belarusian language then moved to the phonetic system of written speech. In 1900, cz, sz and ż began to be replaced by č, š and ž. Because the new letters were used by the newspaper Naša Niwa, Latin was sometimes called "Nasheniv". The previous Latin was sometimes called "Great Lithuanian".

For the Ukrainian language in the nineteenth century, there were two versions of Latin: "Polonized" by Joseph Lozynsky in 1834 ("alphabet") and "Czechized" by the Czech Slavist Josef Jireček in 1859.

Some projects of the 19th century 
In 1833, a brochure by an unknown author appeared in Moscow: "New improved letters of the Russian alphabet" or "Орыt wedenія novыh russkih liter". In it, the author proposed the following alphabet for the Russian language: Aa, Bb, Cc (це), Dd, Ee, Ff, Gg, Hh, Iiĭ, Jj (же), Kk, Ll, Mm, Nn, Oo, Pp, Rr, Ss, Tt, Uu, Vv, Zz, Чч, Шш, Ыы, Юю, Яя.

In 1842 Kodinsky proposed in the book "Simplification of Russian grammar" the Latin alphabet for the Russian language.

In 1857 Kodinsky published the book "Transformation and simplification of n spelling", in which he again proposed to introduce Latin. The proposed Kodin alphabet was a mixture of Romanian, Hungarian and French Latin: Aa, Bb, Cc, Dd, Ee, Ff, Gg, Hh, Ii, Jj, Ll, Mm, Nn, Oo, Pp, Qq, Rr, Ss, Tt, Uu, Üü, Vv, Xx, Yy, Zz. There were quite complex rules of orthography: é (ё), q (к); c (к) at the end of words, before consonants and not palatalized vowels, in the same sense digraph ch (ruchi); c (ч) before palatalized vowels (but compare: noch); g (г) at the end of words, before consonants and non-palatalized vowels, in the same sense digraph gh (noghi); g (ж) before palatalized vowels (giznh); x (x) at the end of words, before consonants and non-palatalized vowels, in the same sense digraph xh; h (ь, ъ). Digraphs: cz (ц), sz (ш), sc (щ), hi (ы) — rhibhi, bhil, czarh. In words of foreign origin is used ç (ц), -ция in foreign words was transmitted -tia. End of surnames -ов, -ев were transmitted -of, -ef. One sound could be transmitted in different letters: еа (я) after consonants, in other cases ia; ѣ (ять) in language and pronouns denoted її (in other cases ê); -е, -ие, -ье> è; i in the end passed й. Letter у transmitted the combination ий/ый or sound [і] in words of Greek origin (ubycza, novy, systema). Combination -шн— transmitted by a trigraph chn. Diphthongs are also introduced: Eugeny, Aurora.

In 1845, a Russian Latin was offered by V. Belinsky that excluded digraphs  : Aa, Bb, Cc (це), Dd, Ee, Ff, Gg (густое «га»), Hh (тонкое «га»), Ii, Jj, Kk, Ll, Mm, Nn, Oo, Pp, Rr, Ss, Ss (ша), Tt, Uu, Vv, Хх (хер), Чч (черв), Цц (ща), Zz, Ƶƶ (живете), Ъъ (ер), Ьь (ерь), Уу (еры), Яя, Ŋ ŋ (ю).

In 1862, Julian Kotkowskit suggested in a pamphlet that all Slavs use the Polish alphabet.

In 1871, Zasyadko proposed his Latin project.

Soviet project 
In 1919, the Scientific Department of the People's Commissariat, not without the participation of People's Commissar AV Lunacharsky, spoke "... about the desirability of introducing the Latin font for all nationalities inhabiting the territory of the Republic ... which is a logical step on the path to which Russia has already entered, adopting a new calendar style and metric system of weights and measures. This would be the completion of the alphabetic reform, once performed by Peter I, and would be in connection with the last orthographic reform.

In the 1920s and 1930s, a wave of Latinization of the writing of non-Russian peoples swept across the country, and Cyrillic was reduced to the absolute. The territory of the USSR, where the Cyrillic alphabet (Russian) was used, was already a kind of wedge, because Latin was used in the north and east of Siberia (Komi, Yakutia). In the south of the country (Central Asia), Latin was also used. The same in the Volga region (Tatar ASSR) and other regions (Caucasus).

In 1929, the People's Commissariat of Education of the RSFSR formed a commission to develop the question of the Latinization of the Russian alphabet, headed by Professor NF Yakovlev and with the participation of linguists, bibliologists, and printing engineers. In total, the commission included 13 people, including:

 A. M. Sukhotin,
 L. I. Zhyrkov (had experience in creating alphabets with N. F. Yakovlev),
 A. M. Peshkovsky,
 N. M. Karynska,
 S. I. Abakumov (famous Russians),
 V. I. Lytkin (secretary, the first linguist of the Komi people).

The commission completed its work in January 1930. The final document (signed by all but AM Peshkovsky) proposed three versions of n Latin, slightly different from each other (published in № 6 "Culture and Literature of the East" in 1930). From the minutes of the commission meeting of 14 / I 1930: "The transition in the near future of Russian to a single international alphabet on a Latin basis — is inevitable."

Variants of the three previous projects were as follows: 1) eliminates diacritical marks, separate from the letters; 2) strives for maximum use of its own Latin characters in printing houses; 3) on the basis of the "new Turkic alphabet". These 3 projects differed only in the display of the letters ё ы ь я ю (the last five positions in the table below). In the first version, the alphabet consisted of 30 letters, and in the second and third of 29 (due to the dual use of j):

Letter Щ was represented by a combination of sc: jesco (ещё), vesci (вещи).

After hissing instead ё offered to write o — cort (чёрт), scot (счёт). This idea would later be proposed again in the failed 1964 spelling reform.

The principle of the Russian Cyrillic alphabet remained, according to which the softness of consonants before vowels is reflected by means of special vowels (я, ю, ё, е), and in other cases with an additional letter ь.

In the first version of the softening sign corresponded to a special letter í, and in the second and third for ь and й the same letter was used j.

Where я, ю, ё and е transmit two sounds (at the beginning of syllables), they were asked to write in two letters: яблоко — jabloko, Югославия — Jugoslavija. The attenuation sign was therefore excluded from the alphabet unnecessarily — sjezd. Thus in all variants of the project a soft sign before я, е, ё and ю when writing a new alphabet dropped — Nju-Jork, vjuga.

Examples written for three projects:

On January 25, 1930, the Politburo of the Central Committee of the All-Union Communist Party (Bolsheviks), under the chairmanship of Stalin, instructed Glavnauka to stop working on the question of the Latinization of the Russian alphabet.

The case did not reach the practical implementation of the project. His memory remained mainly in a humorous context: in the popular novel by IA Ilf and EP Petrov "Golden Calf" describes the invented comrade. Polykhaeva (head of the office called "Hercules") universal stamp with the following text:

It is reported that employees were "particularly confused by the paragraph about the Latin alphabet." Although the action of the novel dates back to 1930 — the apogee of the Soviet campaign for Latinization, it is clear that the decisive promise in the city of the Black Sea (ie in Odessa) was premature and absurd.

After 1936, the translation of the n letter into Latin, apparently, no one thought, because the opposite process began — Cyrillic. Work on the recording of the Russian language in Latin moved into the plane of development of transliteration systems. Also under the name of romanization are known foreign developments for the Cyrillic alphabet. They are usually listed in a table of different ways to transliterate the Russian alphabet.

Cases of Latin use in the post-Soviet period 
The original way of transmitting the Russian language in Latin was proposed in 2005 by Lyudmila Petrushevskaya, calling it "Nikolaitsa" in honor of her grandfather, the linguist N.F. Yakovlev.

On August 25, 2017, Vladimir Petrov, a deputy of the Legislative Assembly of the Leningrad Region, addressed the Ministry of Education and Science of the Russian Federation and the Russian Academy of Sciences with a request to create a second Russian alphabet based on the Latin alphabet. The deputy asked officials and academics to study the arguments in favor of creating a single Latin alphabet of the Russian language, as well as its parallel implementation for use and study in Russian educational institutions.

See also 

 Latinisation in the Soviet Union
 Belarusian Latin alphabet
 Ukrainian Latin alphabet

References

Literature 

 Алпатов В. М. Про латинізації російської мови // мікроязик. Мови. Інтер'язикі: збірник на пошану ординарного професора А. Д. Дуліченко / під ред. А. Кюннапа, В. Лефельдта, С. Н. Кузнєцова ; Тартуський університет, кафедра слов'янської філології. — Tartu : Tartu Ülikool, 2006. — 576 с. — С. 271-279. —.
 Грот Я. К. Спорные вопросы русскаго правописанія отъ Петра Великаго донынѣ. — СПб., 1873.
Pages with unreviewed translations
Latin alphabets
Language policy in Russia